British recording artist Cheryl has appeared in numerous music videos and films. Her videography includes ten music videos, three guest appearances in other artists' videos, two film appearances and several television appearances.

Cheryl released her debut solo single "Fight for This Love", from her debut album 3 Words, the video was shot in 2009 by director Ray Kay, and the second and third single's videos from the album were shot by Vincent Haycock and AlexandLiane, respectively. In 2010 Cheryl released her second studio album Messy Little Raindrops. The lead single from the album "Promise This" was directed by Sophie Muller, as was the album's second single "The Flood". A Million Lights was the third studio album by Cheryl released in 2012, both singles from the album "Call My Name" and "Under the Sun" were shot by director Anthony Mandler.

Cheryl made her first film appearance in 2007, with her Girls Aloud colleagues in the film St Trinian's. She made her second appearance as a talent show judge in the 2012 film What to Expect When You're Expecting which featured actresses Cameron Diaz and Jennifer Lopez.

Cheryl has been featured in numerous television programs with "Girls Aloud" members including Girls Aloud: Home Truths (2005), Girls Aloud: Off the Record  (2006), The Passions of Girls Aloud (2008), The Girls Aloud Party (2008), and the show that formed the band Popstars: The Rivals  (2002). In 2009 Cheryl was given a one-off television special entitled Cheryl Cole's Night In, produced for ITV, that aired on December 12, 2009, at 6:30 pm.

In 2008, Cheryl replaced Sharon Osbourne on The X Factor after Osbourne’s departure. In Cheryl's first year on the show, she ended up as the victorious judge when Alexandra Burke was crowned the fifth winner of The X Factor on December 13, 2008. Cheryl returned for the sixth series in 2009 and was given the boys category (made up of male contestants aged 16 to 25). Cheryl emerged as the winning judge for a second consecutive year after Joe McElderry was crowned the sixth winner of The X Factor. She returned for a third year in which her act came second. In 2011, she left the British X Factor and moved to The X Factor USA, before being replaced by Nicole Scherzinger. She returned to the UK X Factor as a main judge in 2014 and 2015.

Music videos

Featured videos

Filmography

Television

See also
 Girls Aloud videography
 Cheryl discography

References

Videographies of British artists
Videography

es:Anexo:Discografía de Cheryl Cole
it:Discografia di Cheryl Cole
hu:Cheryl Cole-diszkográfia
pl:Dyskografia Cheryl Cole
pt:Anexo:Discografia de Cheryl Cole